Hugh W. Dougall (–) was a Latter-day Saint hymnwriter.

Dougall was born in Salt Lake City to William B. Dougall and his wife the former Maria Young.  Dougall's mother was a daughter of Brigham Young.

Dougall served an LDS mission in the Southern States Mission from 1894-1896.  Among hymns by Dougall are "Jesus of Nazareth, Savior and King" and the music to "Come Unto Him".  His song "The Bridge Builder" was used extensively by the Young Men's Mutual Improvement Association in the early 20th century.

Dougall also served as music supervisor for Utah's Public Schools.  Dougall was also involved with the Salt Lake Opera Company.

See also
Descendants of Brigham Young

Notes

References 
 
 J. Spencer Cornwall. Stories of Our Mormon Hymns. (Salt Lake City: Bookcraft, 1975) p. 100-101.
 explanation of "The Bridge Builder"

1872 births
1963 deaths
American Latter Day Saint hymnwriters
American Mormon missionaries in the United States
Burials at Salt Lake City Cemetery
Richards–Young family
Latter Day Saints from Utah